Andrew Holman Hamilton (June 7, 1834 – May 9, 1895) was an American lawyer and politician who served two terms as a politician from Indiana who served in the United States House of Representatives from 1875 to 1879.

Personal life
He was born in Fort Wayne, Indiana, June 7, 1834, the oldest son of Allen Hamilton, an Irish immigrant and local banker. Hamilton attended the common schools and graduated from Wabash College in Crawfordsville in 1854.  Hamilton studied law at Harvard University. After being admitted to the bar in 1859, he began to practice law in Fort Wayne.

Hamilton married Phoebe Taber in 1851. The couple had five children.

Political career
He was elected as a Democrat to the Forty-fourth and Forty-fifth Congresses (March 4, 1875 – March 3, 1879). After his term in the House, he resumed the practice of law.

He is the uncle of Edith Hamilton and Alice Hamilton.

Death
Hamilton died in Fort Wayne on May 9, 1895.  He is interred in Lindenwood Cemetery.

References

1834 births
1895 deaths
American people of Scotch-Irish descent
Harvard Law School alumni
Wabash College alumni
Democratic Party members of the United States House of Representatives from Indiana
19th-century American politicians